Xanthoparmelia (commonly known as green rock shields or rock-shield lichens) is a genus of foliose lichen in the family Parmeliaceae. Xanthoparmelia is synonymous with Almbornia, Neofuscelia, Chondropsis, Namakwa, Paraparmelia, and Xanthomaculina. This genus of lichen is commonly found in the United States, as well as Australia, New Zealand and Ecuador.

The name means 'golden yellow parmelia'. The photobiont (photosynthetic partner) is Trebouxia (a genus of green algae).

Identification
Distinguishing between species involves how much they are attached to the substrate, whether or not isidia are present, lower surface color, and chemical spot tests. All members of the genus react to spot test as K-, KC+ yellow, with medulla reaction varying from species to species.

Species

Species include:
 Xanthoparmelia chlorochroa
 Xanthoparmelia conspersa (Parmelia conspersa)
 Xanthoparmelia cumberlandia
 Xanthoparmelia lavicola - a foliose (leaf-like) lichen found on basalt
 Xanthoparmelia lineola
 Xanthoparmelia maricopensis
 Xanthoparmelia mexicana
 Xanthoparmelia metastrigosa
 Xanthoparmelia mougeotii (Parmelia mougeotii)
 Xanthoparmelia nana
 Xanthoparmelia pokornyi
 Xanthoparmelia subramigera
 Xanthoparmelia scabrosa
 Xanthoparmelia tinctina

Taxonomy
Xanthoparmelia was originally conceived of as a section of the genus Parmelia by Brazilian lichenologist Edvard August Vainio in 1890, to accommodate yellow species with narrow lobes. Mason Hale considered that the combination of traits including the presence of the cortical pigment usnic acid, and the microscopic structure of the upper cortex were sufficient criteria to segregate Xanthoparmelia from the genus Parmelia. He formally transferred 93 species, including the type, Xanthoparmelia conspersa.

In a 2004 study, molecular analysis was used to help revise the classification of parmelioid lichens containing Xanthoparmelia-type lichenan. This analysis demonstrated that several genera previously segregated from Xanthoparmelia on the basis of physical characteristics did not form distinct clades within Xanthoparmelia, and so Neofuscelia, Chondropsis and Paraparmelia were synonymized with Xanthoparmelia. As a result of this work, 10 new species were published, and 129 new combinations into Xanthoparmelia were proposed. Similarly, three south African genera, Almbornia, Namakwa, and Xanthomaculina, were synonymized with Xanthoparmelia after the limits of the genus were further explored and refined with molecular phylogenetics. Karoowia, a genus that was characterized by features such as its subcrustose growth form and its presence of an arachiform vacuolar body in the ascospores, was synonymised with Xanthoparmelia when it was shown that its species cluster in different clades nested within Xanthoparmelia. The genus Omphalodiella, proposed by Aino Henssen in 1991 to contain the Patagonian species Omphalodiella patagonica, has since been shown to lie within Xanthoparmelia.

Gallery

References

 
Lichen genera
Lecanorales genera
Taxa named by Edvard August Vainio